Liu Haoran (born 10 October 1997), also known as Turbo Liu, is a Chinese actor.

Liu ranked 18th on Forbes China Celebrity 100 list in 2020, 19th in 2019, and 89th in 2017.

In 2021, Liu became the youngest actor to gross over 15 billion RMB (approx. $2.32 billion USD) at the Chinese box office.

Early life
Liu was born in 1997 in Pingdingshan, Henan, and moved to Beijing at the age of 12 to attend the Affiliated Secondary School of Beijing Dance Academy. In 2013 when he was still a student, Liu was hand-picked by Chinese actor/director Chen Sicheng to star in Chen's directorial film debut, Beijing Love Story. In 2015, Liu enrolled in the Central Academy of Drama after receiving the highest yikao score in the University's acting department.

Career
Liu made his acting debut in the 2014 romance film Beijing Love Story, and was nominated for Best New Actor at the 2015 Beijing College Student Film Festival.

In 2015, Liu starred in the comedy mystery film, Detective Chinatown, directed by Chen Sicheng, and won a Best New Actor Award at the Huading Awards for his performance. That same year, Liu starred in his first small-screen project, campus drama With You, which was adapted from the youth novel under the same title. The drama series earned positive reviews, and Liu won Most Popular New Actor at the 2016 iQiyi All-Star Carnival.

In 2017, Liu played Su Yu in the patriotic film, The Founding of an Army. He also featured in the historical mystery film Legend of the Demon Cat, which was directed by acclaimed director Chen Kaige. That same year, he starred in the historical drama, Nirvana in Fire 2, which was a Daylight Entertainment production directed by the famed director Kong Sheng and the sequel to Nirvana in Fire by written by Hai Yan. The series was critically acclaimed, and Liu received recognition for his acting.

In 2018, Liu reprised his role in the film Detective Chinatown 2, which premiered on Chinese New Year. The movie was a box office hit and grossed 3.4 billion RMB and is one of the top 10 highest grossing film of all time in China (as of September 2022). Liu was nominated for Best Actor at the Hundred Flowers Awards for his role and became the youngest actor to be nominated in the lead actor category for this award. For Liu's accomplishments, Forbes China honored him as one of their 30 Under 30 Asia 2018 list, which consisted of 30 influential people under 30 years old who have had a substantial effect in their fields.

In 2019, Liu filmed two movies with Chen Kaige, Flowers Bloom in the Ashes and My People My Country. His xuanhuan epic drama Novoland: Eagle Flag, adapted from novels by the same name written by Jiang Nan, aired on Zhejiang TV, becoming the channel's highest rated drama in the 10pm time slot.

In 2020, Liu graduated from the Central Academy of Drama and successfully auditioned into the China Coal Mine Art Troupe where he also received bianzhe (编制). He performed Xue Wo Zhong Hua with the Art Troupe at China's National Center for the Performing Arts. That same year, he also starred in the films My People My Homeland and Coffee or Tea.

In 2021, Liu's film Detective Chinatown 3 premiered during Chinese New Year and immediately grossed 1.01 billion RMB, 818 million RMB, and 749 million RMB for the first three days, respectively, and continues to hold the record for the top 3 single-day box office revenue in China's box office history. The box office success of Detective Chinatown 3 (totaling in excess of 4.5 billion RMB) catapulted Liu to become the youngest actor to gross over 15 billion RMB (approx. $2.32 billion USD) at the Chinese box office for leading roles. He also starred as Liu Renjing in the film 1921, directed by famed director Huang Jianxin (making it their fourth collaboration).  Also in 2021, Liu's film Fire on the Plain, produced by Diao Yinan, was invited to the main competition at the San Sebastián International Film Festival. That same year, Liu was invited as a representative to attend The 11th Congress of the China Federation of Literary and Art Circles, which occurs once every five years. At 24 years old, he was one of the youngest representatives out of over 2000 attendees.

In 2022, Liu's film Only Fools Rush In, directed by Han Han, premiered during Chinese New Year, making it his third Chinese New Year film. Liu earned a Best Supporting Actor nomination at the 36th Hundred Flower Awards for his portrayal of Liu Renjing in the film 1921.

Filmography

Film

Television Series

Variety Shows

Theater

Discography

Singles

Awards and nominations

Forbes China Celebrity 100

References

External links
 
 

1997 births
Living people
People from Pingdingshan
Central Academy of Drama alumni
Chinese male film actors
Chinese male television actors
Male actors from Henan
21st-century Chinese male actors